H M Revanna is a politician from Karnataka state. He is a leader of Indian National Congress. He was an MLC in Karnataka legislative council from 2014 to 2020.

Political career 
He won twice as MLA from Magadi constituency in 1989 and 1999. On 2 September 2017 he was inducted into Siddaramaiah cabinet as Transport minister. In 2018 elections he contested from Channapatna and lost to former Chief minister H.D.Kumaraswamy.

References

Kannada people
Living people
People from Karnataka
Karnataka politicians
Politicians from Bangalore
Year of birth missing (living people)